Haruna Abubakar was elected Senator for the Nasarawa South constituency of Nasarawa State, Nigeria at the start of the Nigerian Fourth Republic, running on the People's Democratic Party (PDP) platform. He took office on 29 May 1999.

Abubakar was born on 6 June 1952.
He became a lawyer and a businessman, and was legal adviser to the National Party of Nigeria (NPN) during the Nigerian Second Republic. 
He was the Managing Director of Pipelines and Petroleum Products Marketing Company during the military regime of General Sani Abacha.

After taking his seat in the Senate in June 1999 he was appointed to committees on Selection (vice chairman), Senate Services, Petroleum, Judiciary, Economic Affairs and Local & Foreign Debts.
He was also appointed Deputy Senate President in 1999, but later was forced to resign.

Abubakar died in a London hospital after a protracted illness on 27 February 2005. He was buried in Lafia.

References

1952 births
2005 deaths
People from Nasarawa State
National Party of Nigeria politicians
Peoples Democratic Party members of the Senate (Nigeria)
Deaths in England
Burials in Nasarawa State
20th-century Nigerian politicians
21st-century Nigerian politicians